Elizabeth A. Platz is an American cancer epidemiologist. As a professor at Johns Hopkins University, Platz was appointed editor-in-chief of the journal Cancer Epidemiology, Biomarkers & Prevention and elected a Fellow of the American Association for the Advancement of Science.

Early life and education
Platz completed her Master's degree in public health from Yale School of Public Health and her Doctor of Science from the Harvard T.H. Chan School of Public Health.

Career
Following her ScD, Platz joined the faculty at Johns Hopkins University as an assistant professor in the Department of Epidemiology in 1999. While serving in this role, she started the Hormones in Umbilical Cord Blood Study (HUB) to evaluate whether umbilical cord blood hormone and growth factor concentrations differ by race. Platz also co-led a 10-year study of more than 30,000 health professionals that found the longer men take cholesterol-lowering drugs, the far less likely they were to develop advanced prostate cancer. In 2008, Platz was appointed co-director of the Cancer Prevention and Control Program at the Sidney Kimmel Comprehensive Cancer Center.

In 2010, Platz was promoted to the rank of full professor and was selected as the inaugural Abeloff Scholar to support her study into the causes and risk factors of cancer. In 2019, Platz was appointed editor-in-chief of the journal Cancer Epidemiology, Biomarkers & Prevention, one of eight journals published by the American Association for Cancer Research. She was also elected a Fellow of the American Association for the Advancement of Science.

References

External links

Living people
Place of birth missing (living people)
Year of birth missing (living people)
American women epidemiologists
American epidemiologists
Yale School of Public Health alumni
Harvard School of Public Health alumni
Fellows of the American Association for the Advancement of Science
Academic journal editors
Johns Hopkins Bloomberg School of Public Health faculty
21st-century American women